Ingrid Falk is a retired East German rower. At European championships she won a silver medal in the coxed fours in 1964 and a gold in the eights in 1966. Before 1966 she competed as Ingrid Fischer.

References

Year of birth missing (living people)
Living people
East German female rowers
European Rowing Championships medalists